Siyəzən (also, Siazan’, Karasiyazen, Karasiazan’, and Kafasiyazen) is a village in the Siazan Rayon of Azerbaijan.   The village forms part of the municipality of Beşdam.

References 

Populated places in Siyazan District